Takiguchi(also Takigutchi or Takigucci) (written:  or ) is a Japanese surname. Notable people with the surname include:

, Japanese voice actor and narrator
Masaru Takiguchi (born 1941), American sculptor
, Japanese poet, art critic and artist
, Japanese actor

See also
7802 Takiguchi, a main-belt asteroid

Japanese-language surnames